Storming Heaven is Denise Giardina's second novel. It was published in 1987 and won the W.D. Weatherford Award that year. It is a fictionalized account of the labor strife in the coalfields of southern West Virginia, United States during 1920 and 1921. It mainly takes place in the town of Annadel, which is based on the town of Keystone, West Virginia. Its events also have similarities to the Ludlow Massacre, which is mentioned in the book.

Characters

The Marcum Family 
C.J. Marcum - One of the main narrators. A leader of the union who is eventually elected mayor of Annadel. 

Violet Marcum - C.J.'s wife. 

Gladys Marcum Justice - C.J.'s eldest daughter.

The Lloyd Family 
Rondal Lloyd - One of the main narrators. A surrogate son to C.J. Marcum, he becomes a fugitive after joining the union and witnessing a murder.

Talcott Lloyd - Rondal's younger brother. He marries Pricie Justice, and later gets involved with the union.

Kerwin Lloyd - Rondal and Talcott's youngest brother, who dies in a mine explosion.

Clabe Lloyd - Their father, who dies when a mine explodes.

Vernie Lloyd - Clabe's wife, who is very religious.

Dillon Lloyd Clabe's brother, who disappears when the coal operators begin to build the mines.

The Bishop Family 
Carrie Bishop Freeman - One of the main narrators. A nurse who leaves her homestead to live in Annadel.

Miles Bishop - Carrie's elder brother, a coal operator.

Flora Bishop Honaker - Carrie's elder sister.

 Orlando Bishop - Their father.

Ben Honaker - Flora's husband.

Aunt Jane - Both Carrie's great aunt and grandmother, a widow who lives with the rest of the family.

Aunt Becka - Carrie's paternal aunt, a spinster.

The Justices
Ermel Justice - Cousins with C.J.'s grandfather. A successful businessman.     

Annadel Justice - His wife. Violet Marcum's second cousin.  

Isom Justice - Their son, and one of Rondal Lloyd's closest friends. He marries Gladys Marcum.
  
Pricie Justice Lloyd - Their daughter and Talcott Lloyd's wife.

Other Characters 
Rosa Angelelli - One of the main narrators, and a housekeeper for one of the coal operators. An immigrant from Italy.

Dr. Booker - A black doctor who is one of the leaders of the union.

Albion Freeman - Carrie Bishop's husband. A hardshell baptist preacher and a pacifist who doesn't believe in Hell.

References

1987 American novels
American historical novels
Novels set in Appalachia
Novels set in West Virginia
Fiction set in 1920
Fiction set in 1921
Novels about mining